Iván Marcelo Rozas Agüero (born 1 July 1998) is a Chilean professional footballer who plays as a midfielder for Primera División club Deportes Copiapó.

Honours
Universidad de Chile
Primera División: 2017–C

Ñublense
Primera B: 2020

References

External links
 
 Profile at Universidad de Chile

Living people
1998 births
People from Temuco
Chilean footballers
Universidad de Chile footballers
Ñublense footballers
O'Higgins F.C. footballers
Chilean Primera División players
Primera B de Chile players
Association football midfielders